Kon-Well Wang is an American academic and engineer, best known for his research work in structural dynamics, especially in the emerging field of adaptive structures & material systems, with applications in vibration & noise controls. acoustic & elastic wave tailoring, shape morphing & deployment, energy harvesting, structural health monitoring, and vehicle and robotic system dynamics.  He is the Stephen P. Timoshenko Professor of Mechanical Engineering (ME) and Director of the Structural Dynamics and Controls Lab at the University of Michigan (U-M).

Education and career
Wang received his Ph.D. and M.S. degrees from the University of California at Berkeley, and his B.S. degree from the National Taiwan University, all in Mechanical Engineering.  After Ph.D., he worked at the General Motors Research Labs as a Senior Research Engineer, and then started his academic career as an assistant professor at the Pennsylvania State University.  At Penn State, Wang has served as the William E. Diefenderfer Chaired Professor in Mechanical Engineering, co-founder and associate director of the Vertical Lift Research Center of Excellence, and a Group Leader for the Center for Acoustics and Vibration.  He joined the U-M in 2008 as the Stephen P. Timoshenko Professor of Mechanical Engineering.  He has been the U-M ME Department Chair from 2008 to 2018, and with the endowed title of Tim Manganello/BorgWarner Department Chair during 2013–18.  From January 2019 through December 2020, he was selected to serve as the Division Director of the Engineering Education and Centers Division at the National Science Foundation on an Executive Intergovernmental Personnel Act appointment.

Recognition
Wang is a Fellow of the American Society of Mechanical Engineers (ASME), the Institute of Physics (IOP), and the American Association for the Advancement of Science (AAAS). He has been the Technical Editor in Chief of the ASME Transaction Journal of Vibration & Acoustics (2005–09), and an Associate Editor and Editorial Board Member for several other journals. He has received various awards from professional societies for his contributions in research, education and service, such as the ASME Robert E. Abbott Award (2021), the ASME Rayleigh Lecture Award (2020), the Pi Tau Sigma-ASME Charles Russ Richards Memorial Award (2018), the ASME J.P. Den Hartog Award (2017), the Society for Photo-Optical Instrumentation Engineers (SPIE) Smart Structures and Materials Lifetime Achievement Award (2011), the ASME Rudolf Kalman Award (2009), the ASME Adaptive Structures and Materials Systems Prize (2008), the NASA Tech Brief Award (2008), the ASME N.O. Myklestad Award (2007), the Society of Automotive Engineers Ralph Teetor Award (1990), and various best paper awards.

References 

Year of birth missing (living people)
Living people
University of California, Berkeley alumni
National Taiwan University alumni
Fellows of the American Society of Mechanical Engineers
University of Michigan faculty
General Motors people
Pennsylvania State University faculty
Fellows of the Institute of Physics
Fellows of the American Association for the Advancement of Science